Field hockey at the 2000 Summer Olympics was held at the Sydney Olympic Park Hockey Centre.

Medal summary

Medal table

Medalists

Gallery

References

External links

 
Summer Olympics
2000 Summer Olympics events
Field hockey at the Summer Olympics
2000 Summer Olympics